Dakshin Narayanpur is a village in the Arambagh CD block  in the Arambagh subdivision of Hooghly district in the Indian state of West Bengal.

Geography

Area overview
The Arambagh subdivision, presented in the map alongside, is divided into two physiographic parts – the Dwarakeswar River being the dividing line. The western part is upland and rocky – it is extension of the terrain of neighbouring Bankura district. The eastern part is flat alluvial plain area.  The railways, the roads and flood-control measures have had an impact on the area. The area is overwhelmingly rural with 94.77% of the population living in rural areas and 5.23% of the population living in urban areas.

Note: The map alongside presents some of the notable locations in the subdivision. All places marked in the map are linked in the larger full screen map.

Location
Dakshin Narayanpur is located at

Demographics
As per the 2011 Census of India, Dakshin Narayanpur had a total population of 2,070 of which 1,047 (51%) were males and 1,023 (49%) were females. Population in the age range 0–6 years was 245. The total number of literate persons in Dakshin Narayanpur was 1,540 (84.38% of the population over 6 years).

Healthcare
Dakshin Narayanpur Rural Hospital with 30 beds is the major government medical facility in Arambagh CD block.

References

Villages in Hooghly district